Robert Koch (German title: Robert Koch, der Bekämpfer des Todes) is a 1939 Nazi propaganda film directed by Hans Steinhoff and starring Emil Jannings, Werner Krauss and Viktoria von Ballasko. The film was a biopic of the German pioneering microbiologist Robert Koch (1843-1910). It was shot at the Johannisthal Studios in Berlin and premiered at the city's Ufa-Palast am Zoo. The film was made by the Tobis Film company, and was also distributed in the United States by the largest German studio UFA.

Cast

References

Bibliography 
 Reimer, Robert C. & Reimer, Carol J. The A to Z of German Cinema. Scarecrow Press, 2010.

External links 
 

1939 films
1930s biographical drama films
1930s historical drama films
German historical drama films
German biographical drama films
Films of Nazi Germany
1930s German-language films
Films directed by Hans Steinhoff
Films set in the 19th century
Films about Nobel laureates
Films about infectious diseases
Biographical films about physicians
Biographical films about scientists
Robert Koch
Tobis Film films
German black-and-white films
1939 drama films
1930s German films
Films shot at Johannisthal Studios